San Lorenzo is an urban zone in Rome, Italy. Administratively it was part of both Municipio II and Quarter VI Tiburtino.

It occupies roughly the two sides of the early stretch of Via Tiburtina, starting from Termini railway station and ending at the Verano area. The latter includes the ancient basilica of San Lorenzo fuori le Mura, from which the district takes its name.

Originally a working-class neighbourhood (its inhabitants were mostly workers of the Wuehrer Brewery and the freight yard), it has been a popular, left-oriented area. During World War II San Lorenzo was heavily bombed by Allied planes (on 1943-07-19); the only massive bombing of Rome during the war (though not the only air raid on the city), it aimed at disrupting the railway communication pivoting on the nearby huge freight yard; however, it caused also extensive damage to the buildings of the district (including the Policlinico Umberto I and the basilica itself) and killing some 1,500 people.

Maria Montessori's first 3-6 age program was started in San Lorenzo in 1907.

Today San Lorenzo, due to the vicinity of the La Sapienza University, is increasingly assuming the character of a student and young artist district. Pizzerias, bookshops, boutiques and other modern places are subsequently replacing the old popular workshops and small markets. The city is zone of many bars, cafes, restaurants and nightclubs which host also a different cultural discussions and art exhibitions.

In popular culture
Italian singer-songwriter Francesco De Gregori released in 1982 a song dedicated to the 1943 bombing. It is included in the Titanic album of 1982.

See also
San Lorenzo fuori le Mura
Via Tiburtina
Via Volsci
Porta Tiburtina
Campo Verano, cemetery

References

Claudio Rendina, Enciclopedia di Roma, Newton Compton, Rome, 1999.

Subdivisions of Rome
Rome Q. VI Tiburtino